The IAI Green Dragon is a loitering munition developed by the Israel Aerospace Industries. The drone is low cost that can  loiter for 1.5 hours and a range of 40–50 km. It is munition itself with 3 kg warhead that can approach the target silently and hit with the effect of < 1m.

Green Dragon can be launched from a small vehicle through a sealed 1.7-meter-long canister with 12-16 units. Each has 15 kg weight.

Specifications

References 

Harop
Single-engined pusher aircraft
Harop
Loitering munition